Live at the Detroit Jazz Festival is a collaborative live album by Wayne Shorter, Terri Lyne Carrington, Esperanza Spalding, and Leo Genovese. Candid released the album on 9 September 2022. It is also the final recording for Shorter prior to his death in 2023.

Background
The album was recorded live at Carhartt Amphitheater Stage at the 2017 Detroit International Jazz Festival on 3 September 2017. The performance was one of Shorter’s last ones before his retirement and was dedicated to the memory of jazz pianist and composer Geri Allen. The album was named the Best Jazz Instrumental Album at 65th Annual Grammy Awards. Shorter and Genovese were also nominated in the Best improvised jazz solo category for their work on the track "Endangered Species".

The record contains five tracks. Three of them are written by Wayne Shorter, one by Milton Nascimento, and one by Geri Allen, who had to join the band as initially planned but untimely passed away on 27 June 2017. The double vinyl LP version of the album has a bonus track.

Shorter commented on his experiences at the concert: "With the mixture of people — male and female, varying ethnicities and backgrounds — sometimes we did things that sound larger than the four of us, with more of an orchestral approach. If there are things going on in the recording that can be heard by people to the extent that it can turn some thoughts around about life and culture… people who hear it may recognize that we are all different — and the same."

Reception
Larry Applebaum of JazzTimes stated, "A remarkably adventurous performance, it’s finally being released as a double-LP vinyl set with a fascinating bonus track." Thom Jurek of AllMusic wrote, "Live at the Detroit Jazz Festival is a compelling exercise in kinetic, deeply emotional music making (mostly) in the moment . Given Shorter's retirement from performing (he is 89 with health issues) this amounts to a gift as well as a historical document." Stuart Nicholson of Jazzwise commented, "The quartet feel their way into the music and – to use a term Esperanza Spalding uses in the liner notes – they are ‘building the plane while flying it’." Steve Futterman of The New Yorker commented, "Shorter exhibits his instantly unmistakable sonic identity throughout a performance marked by intensity and uncommon musical empathy. It’s not every octogenarian whose work can offer inspiration and direction to today’s upcoming players, but Shorter is nothing if not a glorious anomaly."

Track listing

Personnel
Band
Terri Lyne Carrington – drums, producing, liner notes
Leo Genovese – keyboards, piano, liner notes
Wayne Shorter – sax (soprano), sax (tenor), liner notes
Esperanza Spalding – bass, vocals, liner notes 

Production
Dean Albak – editing engineer
Chris Collins – artistic director
Rob Griffin – mixing
Ed Hatfield – engineer
Harold Larue – mastering
Marek Lazarski – band photo
Tony Phillips – engineer
Timothy Powell – engineer
Yesim Tosuner – graphic design
Chris Woodrich – photography

References

Candid Records live albums
2022 live albums
Esperanza Spalding live albums
Collaborative albums
Wayne Shorter live albums
Terri Lyne Carrington live albums